Hyposmocoma dorsella is a species of moth of the family Cosmopterigidae. It is endemic to the Hawaiian island of Oahu. It was first described by Lord Walsingham in 1907.

External links

dorsella
Endemic moths of Hawaii
Moths described in 1907
Taxa named by Thomas de Grey, 6th Baron Walsingham